Nuria Llagostera Vives and María José Martínez Sánchez were the defending champions, but they chose to not participate this year.Polona Hercog and Barbora Záhlavová-Strýcová won in the final 2–6, 6–1, [10–2] against Sara Errani and Roberta Vinci.

Seeds

Draw

Draws

External links
Doubles Draw

Abierto Mexicano Telcel - Women's Doubles
2010 Abierto Mexicano Telcel